"All of Me" is the twenty-fourth episode and the season finale of the fourteenth season of the American medical drama television series Grey's Anatomy, and the 317th overall episode, which aired on ABC on May 17, 2018. The episode was written by Krista Vernoff and directed by Debbie Allen. The wedding between Alex Karev (Justin Chambers) and Jo Wilson (Camilla Luddington) takes place, and things go awry. Meanwhile, the stress from the past year has taken a toll on Miranda Bailey (Chandra Wilson), and she re-evaluates some of her decisions. It received highly positive reviews from critics with particular praise directed towards Capshaw and Drew's performances.

This episode marked the final appearance of Jessica Capshaw as Arizona Robbins. It also marked the final regular appearances of Jason George as Ben Warren, he was demoted to a recurring cast member for the next season onwards, and Sarah Drew as April Kepner, she would later return as a guest star in both seasons 17 and 18.

Plot
On her last day in Seattle, Arizona helps Alex prepare for his wedding as they reflect on the long history of their relationship. Jo, meanwhile, has been accepted for a prestigious fellowship at Massachusetts General Hospital. The wedding starts off troubled when the majority of the guests arrive at the wrong location and wedding due to a faulty GPS link. While waiting for the guests and thus the start of the ceremony, the engaged couple sneaks off to get intimate in a shed on the domain, but they find themselves stuck afterward. Arizona confesses to April and Richard that she is falling for a single Callie again and fears that it's going to be catastrophic given their turbulent history, but April points out her rekindled relationship with Matthew to prove that life changes people. A drunk DeLuca gives a speech that reflects his grief over losing Sam. As Meredith takes him for a walk, he mistakenly believes her to be seducing him and kisses her. While flattered, she sets the record straight. They then come across the shed and free Jo and Alex. They collectively return to the ceremony garden, only to find the rest of the guests attempting to resuscitate the wedding planner, who has a severe allergic reaction. Intern Levi faints at the sight of blood and accidentally destroys the wedding cake. With the wedding officiant still absent as well as all the other setbacks, Jo and Alex decide to call off the wedding.

April, Arizona, Jackson, Sofia, and Matthew stay behind on the island to clean up. Matthew decides not to waste any more time and proposes to April. With the sudden arrival of the wedding officiant, they seize the opportunity to get married right then and there. Due to his significance to her, April asks Jackson to stay for the wedding. Arizona walks her down the aisle and the couple gets married in an intimate Christian ceremony. With her new husband and new job providing healthcare to homeless communities in Seattle, April is ready to start a brand new chapter in her life. During the ceremony, Arizona receives a text from Callie, who can't wait to be reunited. Meanwhile, on the ferry back to the city, Meredith becomes ordained and officiates the wedding between Jo and Alex.

Bailey and Ben are among the guests who attended the wrong wedding and are the last to leave the church, thus leaving them as the only doctors when the bride's mother collapses. They ride to the hospital with the mother for an emergency surgery. With all the cardiothoracic surgeons unable to scrub in with her, Bailey requests the help of Teddy Altman, who just showed up. In surgery, she asks for a job. While initially unresponsive, Bailey later offers her the job of Interim Chief of Surgery as she had wanted to take a 'stress sabbatical' to fall in love with surgery again, to do research, and spend more time with her family. Teddy and her patient later watch the woman's daughter's wedding via livestream. Witnessing Teddy's emotions and continuous touching of her belly, the woman suspects that Teddy is pregnant, which she confirms.

Production
The episode was written by Krista Vernoff and directed by Debbie Allen. On March 8, 2018, it was announced that both Jessica Capshaw and Sarah Drew would leave the series following the conclusion of the season.

Reception
The episode aired on American Broadcasting Company on May 17, 2018. Upon initial release, it was viewed by 7.60 million people, an increase of 0.25 million from the previous installment; it also garnered a 1.9/8 Nielsen rating. "All of Me" was also the week's most watched drama and ranked tenth on the list of most watched television programmes overall. The 7.60 million audience was also the lowest rated Grey's Anatomy season finale to date.

References

Grey's Anatomy (season 14) episodes
2018 American television episodes
Television episodes about weddings